= Harenfema =

- District
- Country: Ethiopia
- Region: Oromia Region

Harenfema is a district of Oromia Region in Ethiopia.

== See also ==
- Districts of Ethiopia
